Eoreuma multipunctellus is a moth in the family Crambidae. It was described by William D. Kearfott in 1908. It has been recorded from the US state of Arizona.

References

Haimbachiini
Moths described in 1908